Starflyer 59, usually known as Silver, is the self-titled debut album of rock band Starflyer 59, released in 1994 on Tooth & Nail Records.  It has acquired the name Silver due to its cover art.

The album uses heavily distorted and effects-drenched guitars, influenced by British shoegaze and dream pop bands of the early 1990s.  This is in contrast with the band's later work, which is characterized by a cleaner, more traditional, "American rock" sound. CCM Magazine commented that the release was "quite unlike anything else in Christian music" at the time.

The record was produced by Jyro Xhan and Jerome Fontamillas, at the time members of the group Mortal, under the collective pseudonym "Blood".

The album was reissued in 2005 as an extended edition which also included the band's follow-up EP She's the Queen.  This edition is digitally remastered and is packaged with slightly different artwork from that of the original release, replacing a solid silver cover with an illustration of a silver crown. (The original cassette version had a fighter plane illustration on its cover, believed to be in reference to the band's name.)  The album's original liner notes, which consisted of lyrics and cryptic illustrations, were omitted in the reissue.  The last line of the original booklet reads,
"starflyer exclusively rides triumph motor bikes."

Track listing
All songs written by Jason Martin

Personnel
 Jason Martin – vocals, songwriting, drums, guitar
 Andrew Larson – bass guitar
 Blood – production, mixing
 Bob Moon – engineering, mixing
 Brian Gardner - mastering 
 Troy Glessner – digital re-mastering (extended edition)

References

1994 debut albums
Starflyer 59 albums
Tooth & Nail Records albums